Patrick Kelly (born 26 April 1978) is a Scottish former professional footballer who played as a defender.

Career
Born in Kirkcaldy, Kelly played for Celtic Boys Club, Celtic, Newcastle United, Reading, Livingston, Raith Rovers, Partick Thistle, East Fife and Cowdenbeath.

References

1978 births
Living people
Scottish footballers
Celtic F.C. players
Newcastle United F.C. players
Reading F.C. players
Livingston F.C. players
Raith Rovers F.C. players
Partick Thistle F.C. players
East Fife F.C. players
Cowdenbeath F.C. players
Scottish Football League players
English Football League players
Association football defenders